Todd Martin was the defending champion but lost in the final 6–4, 7–6(7–2) against Pete Sampras.

Seeds
All sixteen seeds received a bye to the second round.

  Pete Sampras (champion)
  Andre Agassi (second round)
  Michael Chang (semifinals)
  Thomas Enqvist (quarterfinals)
  Todd Martin (final)
  MaliVai Washington (quarterfinals)
  Paul Haarhuis (third round)
  Marcelo Ríos (third round)
  Mark Woodforde (quarterfinals)
  Mark Philippoussis (semifinals)
  Todd Woodbridge (third round)
  Byron Black (third round)
  Brett Steven (third round)
  Carlos Costa (third round)
  Jiří Novák (quarterfinals)
  Greg Rusedski (third round)

Draw

Finals

Top half

Section 1

Section 2

Bottom half

Section 3

Section 4

External links
 ATP main draw

1996 Singles
1996 ATP Tour